Johan Forsberg (born June 29, 1985) is a Swedish former professional ice hockey winger. He is most known for playing for Luleå HF in Swedish Hockey League (SHL).

Johan became popular among Skellefteå AIK fans after leading the league in playoff goals in 2010 despite the team's elimination in the semifinals.

Career statistics

References

External links

1985 births
Living people
IF Björklöven players
Luleå HF players
Malmö Redhawks players
Piteå HC players
Skellefteå AIK players
Swedish ice hockey right wingers
People from Piteå
Sportspeople from Norrbotten County